Max Steineke was a prominent American petroleum geologist. He was chief geologist at California-Arabian Standard Oil Co. (CASOC)  from 1936 until 1950 (by which time CASOC had become Aramco).  His efforts, and persistence through repeated setbacks,  led to the first discovery of oil in commercial quantities in Saudi Arabia, which took place at the well known as "Dammam No. 7" in March, 1938.  He graduated from Stanford University in 1921 with an AB degree in geology. Steineke died in 1952.

Early life  

Steineke spent his early years on a homestead near Brookings, Oregon, one of nine children of German immigrants. At the age of twelve,
he left home for nearby Crescent City, California, where he found employment at a lumber mill. A school teacher with whom he boarded
took an interest in him, and encouraged his further education.

In 1917 he entered Stanford University (at that time no entrance examination was required). He graduated in 1921 with an AB in geology. In the years between graduation and the beginning of his work in Saudi Arabia, he explored for oil in California, Alaska, Canada, Colombia, and New Zealand.

Discovery of Oil in Saudi Arabia

On May 29, 1933, an oil concession agreement was signed between Saudi Arabia and Standard Oil of California (SoCal), and on November 8, SoCal formed a subsidiary, the California-Arabian Standard Oil Company (CASOC) to manage the concession. The geological formation known as "Dammam Dome" was the first target of exploration, initially investigated by Schuyler B. Henry and J.W.  Hoover in 1933. The first of a series of test wells was drilled
into the formation in 1935.

Steineke had arrived for the first time in Saudi Arabia in 1934, and was appointed chief geologist of CASOC in 1936.
In 1937 he made a round trip of geological reconnaissance across the Saudi Arabian peninsula with a small party of other geologists.

Meanwhile, a series of test wells had been drilled at Dammam. Through 1936 none of the wells had demonstrated the presence of oil in commercial quantities. In December 1936, a "deep test", No. 7, was begun at the urging of Steineke, who wished to test the deeper  porous limestone "Arab Zone" underlying impervious anhydrite.  All through 1937,  No. 7 experienced a series of  expensive accidents and delays, and SoCal management became increasingly impatient. The Arabian venture was costing a lot of money, and so far there wasn't much encouragement.

In early 1938, Steineke was called back to San Francisco.  SoCal had reportedly  decided to "pull the plug" on Saudi Arabian exploration.  Steineke, now the chief geologist of the venture, convinced his managers to at least wait for the results from Dammam #7, which was still drilling at a slow pace. During the first week of March 1938, at a depth of 1440 meters, Dammam No. 7 started producing at commercial  quantities, reaching more than 3000 barrels per day by the end of the month. 
The success at No. 7 quickly led to further positive results, and by 1940, the Dammam field was producing  more than 12,000 barrels per day.

Steineke had found clues to oil at a site  30 miles from Dammam, where, in November 1940, the first well flowed at nearly 10,000 barrels per day.   What Steineke had discovered was the huge Abqaiq field, and King Abdulaziz named Well No. 7 the Prosperity Well.

Steineke developed the  structural drilling technique, a method of drilling shallow holes in order to discover and map the underlying rock formations. It was  widely used in later exploration for oil in Saudi Arabia, and cited when he received 
the Powers Award of the American Association of Petroleum Geologists: "The methods he [Steineke] developed in the area probably resulted in the 
discovery of greater reserves than any other geologist."  The method was instrumental
in the discovery of the most productive oil field ever found: Ghawar.

Steineke continued to work in Saudi Arabia during World War II. During that period CASOC's  role was to produce oil for the allies, and protect the oil fields from enemy occupation. He continued as Aramco's chief geologist until 1950, when his health began to deteriorate.

Steineke died in Los Altos, California, in April, 1952, at age 54.

Awards and honors

The Sidney Powers Memorial Award, American Association of Petroleum Geologists, 1951.

As Thomas Barger wrote, "...Max was much the same as Khamis...Figuratively as well as literally, they both seemed to know where they were and where they were going next."

Steineke Hall, a guest house in the Saudi Aramco Residential Camp in Dhahran, was named in honor of Max Steineke.

Max Steineke Endowed Professorship in the School of Earth Sciences at Stanford University.

See also
Thomas Barger
Saudi Arabian oil

References

20th-century American geologists
Saudi Aramco
Stanford University alumni
Explorers of Arabia
1952 deaths
American expatriates in Saudi Arabia
1898 births